Crazy Legs or Crazylegs may refer to:

People
Elroy Hirsch (1923–2004), American football player 
Crazy Legs (dancer) (Richard Colón, born 1966), American b-boy associated with hip hop culture and the Rock Steady Crew
Ulysses Curtis (1926–2013), running back in the CFL for the Toronto Argonauts from 1950 to 1954
Crazy Legs Conti (born 1974), competitive eater
Alex "Crazy Legs" Henderson, a trombonist from the Big Bad Voodoo Daddy band
Chris “Crazy Legs” Fonseca, a comedian
Damion "Crazy Legs" Hall, American R&B singer

Characters
Crazylegs and Crazylegs, Jr., characters (cranes) from the 1978 animated cartoon series Crazylegs Crane
A character in the 1996 film Don't Be a Menace to South Central While Drinking Your Juice in the Hood played by comic Suli McCullough
Crazylegs (G.I. Joe), a fictional character in the G.I. Joe universe

Other
Crazy Legs (album), a 1993 album by Jeff Beck
Crazylegs Classic, an annual 8 kilometer running race named in honor of Elroy "Crazylegs" Hirsch
Crazylegs (film) (Crazylegs All-American), a 1953 film about Elroy "Crazylegs" Hirsch
"Crazy Legs", a 1957 song by Gene Vincent
"Crazy Legs", a song by Hed PE from the album Broke
"Crazy Legs", a song by Cassius from the album 1999 
Crazy legs, a colloquialism for restless legs syndrome